Eric Evert Lindholm (August 22, 1890 – August 9, 1957) was a Swedish track and field athlete who competed in the 1912 Summer Olympics.

In 1912 he was eliminated in the semi-finals of the 400 metres competition. In the 800 metres event he was eliminated in the first round.

He was also a member of the Swedish relay team which was eliminated in the first round of the 4x400 metre relay event.

References

External links
Profile

1890 births
1957 deaths
Swedish male sprinters
Swedish male middle-distance runners
Olympic athletes of Sweden
Athletes (track and field) at the 1912 Summer Olympics